Chioma Ikokwu (born June 25, 1989) better known as Chioma Goodhair is a Nigerian lawyer, entrepreneur and executive coach. She is the co-founder and CEO of Good Hair Ltd and Brass and Copper Restaurant & Lounge, alongside Kika Osunde. She is the founder of The Good Way Foundation, an organization that focuses on sickle cell disease awareness as one of its major focus areas.

Early life and education
Ikokwu was born on June 25, 1989 in Lagos, Nigeria. She attended the University of Birmingham and graduated in 2010 with an LL.B degree.  She graduated with her LL.M degree in International Environmental Law and International Commercial Arbitration at the University of London (School of Oriental and African Studies) where she finished with a distinction. She attended the Nigerian Law School and was called to the Nigerian Bar in 2013.

Career
After her Master of Laws degree, she briefly worked at a law and arbitration firm in Lebanon before moving back to Nigeria to attend Law School. She met her business partner Kika Osunde at the University of Birmingham where she served as the Social Secretary for the University of Birmingham ACS (Afro Caribbean Society). She co-founded the hair and beauty brand Good Hair Ltd which started in England in 2009, before moving to Nigeria in 2014. Ikokwu and Osunde built a beauty hub known as “The Good Hair Space”. She is part-owner of Brass and Copper, a restaurant and bar in the Good Hair Space in Lekki, Lagos.

She is the founder of the Chioma Ikokwu Start-up Fund Initiative, which focuses on providing capital for small businesses with innovative ideas. She runs an executive coaching program where she mentors entrepreneurs on business creation, branding and marketing

Philanthropy
Her foundation focuses on eradicating poverty, improving healthcare, education and living conditions for the underprivileged people in Africa. The foundation researches and fights for the destigmatization of people affected by sickle cell disease. Ikokwu was also a part of the United Nations Headquarters round table conference, which concentrated on the awareness and management of sickle cell disease, and was presented with a humanitarian award by the African Sickle Cell Foundation in New York.

References

1989 births
Living people
African-American Christians
Nigerian businesspeople
Nigerian women in business
Nigerian women lawyers
Nigerian chief executives
Alumni of the University of London
Alumni of the University of Birmingham
Nigerian humanitarians
Nigerian philanthropists
Participants in Nigerian reality television series
Igbo people